Haworthia bolusii is a species of Haworthia that was originally described by John Gilbert Baker in 1880.

It is closely related to the neighbouring species to the west, Haworthia decipiens, and it is native to the northern part of the Eastern Cape Province in South Africa.

Varieties
 Haworthia bolusii var. blackbeardiana (Poelln.) M.B.Bayer - south central and south Cape Province to Free State. 
 Haworthia bolusii var. bolusii - south Cape Province
 Haworthia bolusii var. pringlei (C.L.Scott) M.B.Bayer - south Cape Province

References

bolusii
Plants described in 1880
Flora of the Cape Provinces
Flora of the Free State
Endemic flora of South Africa
Taxa named by John Gilbert Baker